Compass is a song written by Diane Warren and originally recorded by Australian singer Mark Vincent, the winner of the third edition of Australia's Got Talent, for his second studio album of the same name (2010).

"Compass" was later recorded by Norwegian classical recording artist Didrik Solli-Tangen. It was released in February 2011 through Universal Norway as the third and final single from Solli-Tangen's debut studio album Guilty Pleasures (2011). The song failed to chart.

Track listing 
Digital download
 "Compass" - 3:42

Sam Bailey version

In 2014, "Compass" was recorded by English singer Sam Bailey, the winner of the tenth series of The X Factor. It was released as the second single from her debut studio album The Power of Love on 16 March 2014. The song received its debut airplay on BBC Radio 2 on 18 February 2014. On 24 February, the official audio track was uploaded to YouTube.

References

External links 

2011 singles
2014 singles
2010 songs
Songs written by Diane Warren
Syco Music singles